Călin Virgil Cristea (born 6 May 1988) is a Romanian footballer who plays as a midfielder for Unirea Alba Iulia.

Honours
Unirea Alba Iulia
Liga II: 2008–09
Dunărea Călărași
Liga II: 2017–18
FC U Craiova 1948
Liga II: 2020–21
CSM Reșița
Liga III: 2021–22

References

External links
 
 

1988 births
Living people
Sportspeople from Alba Iulia
Romanian footballers
Romania under-21 international footballers
Association football midfielders
CSM Unirea Alba Iulia players
CS Pandurii Târgu Jiu players
FC Brașov (1936) players
Othellos Athienou F.C. players
SCM Râmnicu Vâlcea players
FC Dunărea Călărași players
ACS Viitorul Târgu Jiu players
ASC Oțelul Galați players
CSM Reșița players
FC U Craiova 1948 players
Lebanese Premier League players
Liga I players
Liga II players
Liga III players
Cypriot Second Division players